What Hits!? is a greatest hits album by American rock band Red Hot Chili Peppers released on September 29, 1992, by EMI. The album contains tracks from the band's first four albums as well as "Under the Bridge" from their fifth album, 1991's hit Blood Sugar Sex Magik, and the Pretty Woman soundtrack contribution/single B-side "Show Me Your Soul." "Behind the Sun" was released as a single and music video to accompany the release of this compilation. The song originally appeared on the band's 1987 album The Uplift Mofo Party Plan. The compilation is the only full-length release of the band to feature "Show Me Your Soul".

Background
This album was released on EMI/Capitol Records through a deal with Warner Bros. Records. The band had left EMI for Warner in 1991 where they would record their biggest album at the time, Blood Sugar Sex Magik. EMI, who owned the rights to the band's first four albums, decided to cash in on the band's newfound mainstream success. The two labels, however, agreed that each label would allow the usage to one song recorded during the Peppers career on each label so each company could produce a greatest hits compilation. EMI chose the band's biggest hit single at the time, "Under the Bridge," for What Hits!? and Warner Bros. chose "Higher Ground", the band's most successful single for EMI, for the band's 2003 compilation Greatest Hits.

The title of the compilation is a joke alluding to the relative lack of success achieved by the Red Hot Chili Peppers during their tenure with EMI, highlighting the irony that many of the tracks included on what is supposed to be a "greatest hits" compilation were generally singles that peaked notably low in the charts, arguably too low to be considered "hits" (and even in some cases, such as "The Brothers Cup," "Backwoods," and "Johnny, Kick a Hole in the Sky", were never released as singles at all with the latter song never even being performed live). Most of the material released on this album were songs taken from Freaky Styley, The Uplift Mofo Party Plan, and Mother's Milk. In 1987, the band attempted to release "Behind the Sun" as a single, but EMI didn't deem the song worthy enough to do so, although the label eventually did when the band became popular in the early 1990s.

In 2013, after EMI was absorbed by the Universal Music Group, What Hits!? saw a re-release as part of UMG's Icon compilation series.

Track listing

Video

A VHS and later, DVD version of What Hits!? was also released. The video collection supersedes the 1990 video collection Positive Mental Octopus. A music video for the single "Behind the Sun" was created for this video collection and received airplay at the time on MTV. The video, which was made without the band's involvement, reuses footage from the band's "Higher Ground" music video along with newly added animation.

What Hits!? contains the following music videos:

"Behind the Sun"
"Under the Bridge"
"Show Me Your Soul"
"Taste the Pain"
"Higher Ground"
"Knock Me Down"
"Fight Like a Brave"
"Jungle Man"
"True Men Don't Kill Coyotes"
"Catholic School Girls Rule"
"Fire (live)"
"Stone Cold Bush" (live)
"Special Secret Song Inside" (live)
"Subway to Venus" (live)

The last four live videos were taken from the band's 1990 Psychedelic Sexfunk Live from Heaven video.

What Promo Hits!?

Prior to the album's release, EMI released a very rare five-song CD sampler titled What Promo Hits!?. The sampler was released to radio stations and not for public sale.
"Higher Ground"
"If You Want Me to Stay"
"Under the Bridge"
"Taste the Pain"
"Behind the Sun"

Personnel
Red Hot Chili Peppers
Anthony Kiedis – vocals
Flea – bass, trumpet
Hillel Slovak - guitar (on tracks 2, 3, 4, 5, 7, 12, 13, 14, 15, 17)
John Frusciante - guitar (on tracks 1, 9, 10, 11, 16, 18)
Jack Sherman - guitar (on tracks 6, 8), backing vocals (on track 1)
Jack Irons - drums (on tracks 2, 3, 4, 5, 7)
Cliff Martinez – drums (on tracks 6, 8, 12, 13, 14, 15, 17)
Chad Smith - drums (on tracks 1, 9, 10, 11, 18)

Additional musicians
Philip "Fish" Fisher – drums (on track 16)
Dave Coleman - cello (on track 16'')

Production
Michael Beinhorn – producer
George Clinton – producer
Norwood Fisher - producer
Andy Gill - producer
Rick Rubin - producer

References

1992 greatest hits albums
Red Hot Chili Peppers compilation albums
Capitol Records compilation albums
EMI Records compilation albums